All four gospels report that Jesus visited Capernaum in Galilee and often attended the synagogue there:

Matthew 4:13 describes Jesus leaving Nazareth and settling in Capernaum
Mark 1 describes Jesus teaching and healing in the synagogue
Luke 4 describes Jesus teaching regularly in the synagogue, cf. Luke 4:23, where Jesus, speaking in the Nazareth synagogue, refers to "what has been heard done" in Capernaum.
John 6: contains Jesus' Bread of Life Discourse; verse 59 confirms that Jesus taught this doctrine in the Capernaum synagogue.

Narrative

Mark's version reads:

Analysis
Roman Catholic theologian John Chijioke Iwe argues that the Markan pericope marks the beginning of the last year of the three years of the public ministry of Jesus.

John McEvilly points out that the spirit is called “unclean,” since it, delights in, and stimulates to, "acts of uncleanness."

See also
Life of Jesus in the New Testament
Bread of Life Discourse
Ministry of Jesus
Miracles of Jesus
parables of Jesus

References

Sources

Exorcisms of Jesus
Capernaum